Pietermaritzburg (Zulu: umGungundlovu) is the capital and second-largest city in the province of KwaZulu-Natal, South Africa. It was founded in 1838 and is currently governed by the Msunduzi Local Municipality. Its Zulu name umGungundlovu is the name used for the district municipality. Pietermaritzburg is popularly called Maritzburg in Afrikaans, English and Zulu alike, and often informally abbreviated to PMB. It is a regionally important industrial hub, producing aluminium, timber and dairy products, as well as the main economic hub of Umgungundlovu District Municipality.  The public sector is a major employer in the city due to local, district and provincial governments located here.

The city has many schools and tertiary education institutions, including a campus of the University of KwaZulu-Natal.  It had a population of 228,549 in 1991; the current population is estimated at over 600,000 residents (including neighbouring townships) and has one of the largest populations of Indian South Africans in South Africa.

Pietermaritzburg is an emerging metropolitan area.

History 

The city was founded (April 1838) by the Voortrekkers, following the murder of Piet Retief and his seventy-strong party at the Zulu Capital, Mgungunhlovu (6 February 1838), when seeking land to settle around Port Natal (The Natal-Land Treaty), and from where the reprisal Wenkommando departed (November 1838) to defeat Dingane at the Battle of Blood River (16 December 1838). Pietermaritzburg is approximately  direct from the Zulu capital, Mgungunhlovu. Prior to the battle (9 December 1838) a vow was taken that if the Boers were granted victory over the Zulus, then a sacred church would be built which still stands today, The Church of the Vow. It was Jan Gerritze Bantjes, Secretary General to Andries Pretorius, Commander of the campaign who arranged the financing of the church by the Boer towns folk which by then had taken a low priority after the war. The town grew rapidly to become the capital of the short-lived Boer Republic or Natalia. Britain took over Pietermaritzburg in 1843 and it became the seat of the Natal Colony's administration with the first lieutenant-governor, Martin West, making it his home. Fort Napier, named after the governor of the Cape Colony, Sir George Thomas Napier, was built to house a garrison. In 1893, Natal received responsibility for its own government, and an assembly building was built along with the city hall.

On 7 June 1893, while the young Mahatma Gandhi was on his way to Pretoria, a white man objected to Gandhi's presence in a first-class carriage. Despite Gandhi having a first-class ticket, he was ordered by the conductor to move to the van compartment at the end of the train: he refused, and he was removed from the train at Pietermaritzburg.

Shivering through the winter night in the waiting room of the station, Gandhi made the momentous decision to stay on in South Africa and fight the racial discrimination against Indians there. Out of that struggle emerged his unique version of nonviolent resistance, Satyagraha. Today, a bronze statue of Gandhi stands in Church Street, in the city center.

In 1910, when the Union of South Africa was formed, Natal became a province of the Union, and Pietermaritzburg became one of the capitals of the country. During apartheid, the city was segregated into various sections. 90% of the Indian population was moved to the suburb of Northdale while most of its Zulu inhabitants were moved to the neighbouring township of Edendale and white inhabitants were moved out of those areas.

Name 
There exist two interpretations about the origin of the city's name. One is that it was named after Piet Retief (Pieter Mauritz Retief) and Gerrit Maritz (Gerhardus Marthinus Maritz), two Voortrekker leaders.  The other is that it was originally named after Piet Retief's full name alone. In this interpretation the original name was "Pieter Mauritz' Burg", later transliterated to the current name. In 1938 the city announced officially that the second element Maritz should also honour Gert Maritz.

In fact neither Retief nor Maritz ever reached Pietermaritzburg. Retief was killed by Dingane, successor to Shaka, king of the Zulus. Maritz died of illness on 23 September 1838 near the present-day town of Estcourt, some eighty kilometres northwest of Pietermaritzburg, after the battle with the Zulus at Bloukranz.

At the time of the rise of the Zulu Empire, the site that was to become Pietermaritzburg was called Umgungundlovu. This is popularly translated from the Zulu as "Place of the Elephant", although it could also be translated to mean "The elephant wins". Umgungundlovu is thus thought to be the site of some Zulu king's victory since "Elephant" (Indlovu) is a name traditionally taken by the Zulu monarch. Legend has it that Shaka had his warriors hunt elephant there to sell the ivory to English traders at Durban (then called Port Natal). Today, the town is still called by its Voortrekker name, although the municipality of which it is part bears the Zulu name.

Education 

The "University of Natal" was founded in 1910. In 1922 the University extended to Durban. The two campuses were incorporated into the University of Natal in March 1949. It became a major voice in the struggle against apartheid and was one of the first universities in the country to provide education to African students. It became the University of KwaZulu-Natal on 1 January 2004.

Other historical events 

The first newspaper in Natal, the Natal Witness (now known as The Witness), was published in 1846. 
The 46 hectare Botanic Gardens were created in 1872 by the Botanic Society of Natal. 
Mahatma Gandhi was thrown out of a train in The Pietermaritzburg Railway Station in 1893, which marked a turning point later on in Gandhi's life and of the course assist India's freedom-struggle in 1915.
The city hall, which is the largest red-brick building in the Southern Hemisphere, was destroyed by a fire in 1895, but was rebuilt in 1901. It houses the largest pipe organ built by the Sheffield organ building company, Brindley & Foster.
The British built a concentration camp here during the Second Boer War to house Boer women and children.
In 1919 communist activist David Ivon Jones was arrested for distributed an anti-segregation leaflet he co-authored in Pietermaritzburg. His trial became the first major court case against communism in South African history.
During the Second World War, Italian prisoners of war were housed in Pietermaritzburg. During their stay, they built a church, which remains standing as a heritage site today.
In 1962, Nelson Mandela was arrested in the nearby town of Howick to the north of Pietermaritzburg. The arrest marked the beginning of Mandela's 27 years of imprisonment. A small monument has been erected at the location of his arrest. Immediately after his arrest Mandela was taken to the Old Prison in Pietermaritzburg. After a night in the prison, he was taken to Magistrate J. Buys's office in the old Magistrates Court Building in Commercial Road (now Chief Albert Luthuli Road), and was remanded for trial in Johannesburg.

Capital status 

Pietermaritzburg was the capital of the Colony of Natal until 1910, when the Union of South Africa was formed, and Natal became a province of the Union.  Prior to 1994, Pietermaritzburg was the capital of Natal Province. Following the first post-apartheid elections in South Africa, as a result of which the Inkatha Freedom Party won a majority in the KwaZulu-Natal provincial government, Pietermaritzburg shared its status as capital of the (then newly created) province of KwaZulu-Natal with Ulundi. Pietermaritzburg became the legislative capital of the new province, while Ulundi became the administrative capital. The IFP, being strongly Zulu nationalist, desired that Ulundi, the capital of the Zulu Kingdom at the time of its fall to the British in the Anglo-Zulu War, be the post-apartheid capital of the province. Ulundi had also been the capital of the bantustan KwaZulu, which makes up a portion of modern KwaZulu-Natal. However, Ulundi severely lacked the infrastructure to be an effective seat of government, and the African National Congress (ANC) and the Democratic Party, the two other strong political parties in the province, among others, called for Pietermaritzburg alone to be the capital. The debate came to an end when the ANC came to power in the province in 2004, and named Pietermaritzburg the sole capital of KwaZulu-Natal. This has resulted in the relocation of several government offices to Pietermaritzburg, an action that has generally been welcomed as a positive development for the region. Since 2004, progress such as the modernisation of several buildings in the city centre and a proliferation of retail and housing developments in the suburbs are results of recent investment in the city by both the public and private sectors.

Economy 
Until the late-1990s, the region was renowned for the production of high quality textile, clothing and footwear products. An example of the latter included the production of Doc Marten shoes. However, these industries have declined in the area due to lower production costs in Asia. Extensive timber plantations and numerous citrus farms surround the city, contributing a significant share of the city's output.

The Liberty Group has made major investments in several phases in the region since 2002 with the development of the Liberty Midlands Mall (the area's largest shopping centre by gross lettable area and its most prestigious) and Stay Easy hotel. Hulett's Aluminium and Willowton cooking oil contributes a substantial part of the region's industrial output.

Pietermaritzburg is also the city where major South African pizza franchise Debonairs Pizza was founded. The city is the location of the first Debonairs Pizza take away restaurant, opened in 1991.

Coat of arms 

The Pietermaritzburg borough council assumed a coat of arms in 1861. The shield depicted an elephant standing on grass, and a cross of five stars was placed above the shield.  The motto was Umgungunhlovu.  It is unclear what the original colours were, but by 1910 the shield had been coloured blue. By 1931, the council had approved new artwork in which the stars were placed on a radiant sun. The arms were registered with the Natal Provincial Administration in November 1950. Many early renditions of the coat of arms, visible on older public building and wrought iron lampposts, features an elephant which is clearly an Asian Elephant rather than an African elephant.  More recent versions reflect an African elephant.

The final version of the arms was granted by the College of Arms in May 1961.  It was registered at the Bureau of Heraldry in May 1973. The blazon was: Per fess Azure and Vert, over all an elephant statant Or, tusked Argent (i.e. the shield was divided horizontally into blue over green, and displayed a gold elephant with silver tusks).  The crest was changed to a blue sun displaying gold and silver stars, and two black wildebeest were added as supporters.  Each had a shield on its shoulder, the dexter supporter's shield displaying the Union Jack and the sinister supporter's the flag of the Natalia republic.

Transport

Road 

The R33 connects Pietermaritzburg with Lephalale via Greytown, Paulpietersburg, Carolina, Belfast and Vaalwater to the northeast, while the R56 connects Pietermaritzburg with Cape Town via Ixopo, Kokstad, Dordrecht, Molteno, Middelburg, then taking the N10 to Hanover and then the N1 via Beaufort West to the west, and Mthatha, East London, Port Elizabeth, George and Mossel Bay via the N2 to the southwest.

Air 
The city is served by Pietermaritzburg Airport, which has regular scheduled services to OR Tambo International Airport in Johannesburg. There are 4 flights to Johannesburg and 4 return flights daily, with a reduced number of weekend flights. It once operated flights to Cape Town International Airport in Cape Town – this route was terminated in 2019.

Rail 
Pietermaritzburg Railway Station is served by long distance trains on the Durban-Johannesburg and Durban-Cape Town routes of Shosholoza Meyl.

It has been proposed that the Metrorail commuter rail system be expanded from Cato Ridge to Pietermaritzburg.

Bus 
The Pietermaritzburg Municipality historically operated a tram service, which was closed down in the 1940s, and a bus service, which was closed down in the 1980s.

Nowadays regular daily bus services connect Pietermaritzburg to other major cities in South Africa. The bus station is located on Burger Street, opposite the McDonalds Centre, and it serves major bus companies. Greyhound and Intercape are the most reliable and they operate several round-trips from Durban to Johannesburg daily, where Pietermaritzburg is the second to last stop before Durban.

Taxis 
Pietermaritzburg has two types of taxi services: metered taxis and minibus taxis. Unlike in many cities, metered taxis are not allowed to drive around the city to solicit fares and instead must be called and ordered to a specific location. A number of companies service Pietermaritzburg and surrounding areas. These taxis can also be called upon for airport transfers, point to point pickups and shuttles.

Minibus taxis are the standard mode of transport for the majority of the population who cannot afford private vehicles.

Integrated Rapid Public Transport (IRPT) 
A bus rapid transit system is currently being developed in Pietermaritzburg.

The initial phase would see the development of a west to east corridor from Edendale to Northdale. The BRT route will traverse the CBD along Church Street.

Geography

Climate 

Pietermaritzburg has a dry-winter humid subtropical climate (Köppen climate classification: Cwa). Summers are warm and occasionally hot, with frequent rainfall. Winters are dry with high diurnal temperature variation, with light air frosts being possible.

Sport 
Pietermaritzburg is home to the oldest football (soccer) club of South Africa and the African continent: Savages FC PMB, founded in 1882.
The Comrades Marathon takes place annually in June between Pietermaritzburg and Durban. It has been run since 1921 and attracts thousands of entrants. The start of the race alternates between the two cities.
Between December 1953 and November 1981, Pietermaritzburg had an international standard motor racing circuit located on the outskirts of the city. The Roy Hesketh Circuit measured . The circuit was named after South African driver Roy Hesketh. During its period of operation it hosted rounds of the South African National Drivers Championship, the Springbok Series and national Formula Atlantic races. The circuit was also like a second home to Mike Hailwood. The track was known for hosting the Easter races as well – a festival of racing over three days. The expansion of the town of Pietermaritzburg eventually led to the redevelopment of the site as a residential and business zone after racing ceased at the end of 1981. The section from Henry's Knee to the top of Beacon still exists, and is undergoing protection from further development as an important piece of Pietermaritzburg's history. From 1948 until 1953 races were held at the  Alexandra Park Street Circuit on streets within the town of Pietermaritzburg.
Former Springbok and World Cup Winner Joel Stransky was born in Pietermaritzburg on 16 July 1967, he matriculated from Maritzburg College.
Former South African Cricketer Jonty Rhodes was born in Pietermaritzburg on 27 July 1969, he also attended Merchiston Prep school and later matriculated from Maritzburg College.
The English cricketer Kevin Pietersen was born in Pietermaritzburg on 27 June 1980, as was the Springbok cricketer Cuan McCarthy.
The yearly Amashovashova is a  road cycling classic race held since 1986 which starts in Pietermartizburg and finishes in Durban. It is normally held in October.
South African cricketer David Miller was born in Pietermaritzburg on 10 June 1989.
In 2010, the BMX Racing World Championship took place in the city of Pietermaritzburg between 15 July and 1 August.
In January there is an annual canoe race, the Dusi Canoe Marathon, from Pietermaritzburg to Durban. The route follows the Msunduzi River into the Mgeni River, through the Valley of a Thousand Hills into the Inanda Dam and from here to the mouth of the Mgeni River.
The Midmar Mile is one of the largest open-water swimming events in the world; taking place at Midmar Dam, north of Pietermaritzburg in February every year, it attracts over 16,000 swimmers from around the world.
The Harry Gwala Stadium is a Multi-purpose stadium, and is mostly used for football matches, it is the home ground of Premier Soccer League club Maritzburg United.
The Pietermaritzburg Msunduzi Athletics Stadium is currently being developed.
The Pietermaritzburg Oval is considered one of the most picturesque cricket grounds in South Africa, and it hosted two matches during the 2003 Cricket World Cup.
Pietermaritzburg cricket ground is notable as one of the two grounds used regularly for first-class cricket that have a tree within the boundary (the other is St Lawrence Ground in Canterbury, Kent).
Woodburn Stadium is currently used for most club rugby in Pietermaritzburg.
The Kershaw Park Tennis Complex is a tennis stadium.
The above facilities form the centre of the Pietermaritzburg sports precinct.

Tourism

Some of the area's tourist attractions include; the KwaZulu-Natal Museum, City Hall, Colonial Buildings, Imperial Hotel, Comrades House and SANBI Botanical Gardens.

Attractions in the surrounding areas include; Albert Falls Nature Reserve, Howick Falls, Midmar Public Nature Reserve, Queens Elizabeth Park and World's View.

Education

Schools
 Allandale Primary School
 Arthur Blaxall School
 Ashdown Primary School 
 Athlone Primary School 
 Nsikayethu Secondary School 
 Alexandra High School 
 Berg Street Primary School 
 Bisley Park Primary School 
 C21 Private School 
 Carter High School (South Africa) 
 Clarendon Primary School School
 Clifton Preparatory School 
 Copesville Primary School 
 Cordwalles Preparatory School 
 Deccan Road Primary School
 Eastwood Primary School 
 Edendale Technical High School 
 Epworth School 
 Esther Payne Smith Secondary School
 Eastwood Primary School
 Eastwood Secondary School
 Evangelical Seminary of Southern Africa 
 Forest Hill Primary School 
 Gert Maritz Primary school
 Glenwood Primary School 
 Greenhill Primary School 
 Hayfields Primary School 
 Haythorne Secondary School 
 Heather Secondary School 
 Heritage Academy 
 H.S Ebrahim School 
 Islamia Muslim School 
 Kharina Secondary School 
 Linpark High School 
 Longmarket Girls Primary School 
 Marion High School
 Maritzburg College 
 Maritzburg Christian School 
 Maritzburg Preparatory School
 Maritzburg Muslim School for Girls 
 Merchiston Preparatory School 
 ML Sultan Secondary School
 Mountain Rise Primary School
 New Forest Primary School
 Newholmes Primary School
 Nizamia Islamic School 
 Nobanda Primary School
 Northdale Primary School
 Northlands Primary School 
 Northern Park Primary School
 Northbury Park Secondary School
 Orient Heights Primary School
 Panorama Primary School 
 Pelham Senior Primary School
 Pietermaritzburg Girls' High School
 Prince Alfred Primary School 
 Ramatha Road Primary School 
 Raisethorpe Secondary School
 Ridgeview Primary School
 Rosefern Primary School
 Russell High School
 Scottsville Primary School 
 Seth Mokitimi Methodist Seminary
 Shri Vishnu Primary School 
 Siyahlomula High School
 Silver Heights Secondary School
 Sobantu Secondary School
 Springhaven Primary School 
 St. Charles College, Pietermaritzburg 
 St. John's Diocesan School for Girls
 St Joseph's Theological Institute, Cedara
 St. Nicholas Diocesan School
 Suncrest Primary School 
Sukuma Comprehensive Secondary
 Sweetwaters Primary School 
 Thornhill Christian College
 TPA Primary School 
 Union Bible Institute
 Union Park Primary School
 University of KwaZulu-Natal 
 Voortrekker High School
 W.A Lewitt Primary School  
 The Wykeham Collegiate 
 Woodlands Primary School 
 Woodlands Secondary School, Pietermaritzburg
 Uminathi Christian College

Tertiary institutions
Pietermaritzburg has a well-developed higher system of public universities. Pietermaritzburg is served by two public universities, University of KwaZulu-Natal and Durban University of Technology. There are also many private and public colleges operating in the city, some of the larger colleges are: Umgungundlovu TVET College, Varsity College, and Rosebank College.

Civil society 

Pietermaritzburg is home to a number of prominent civil society organisations including the Abahlali baseMjondolo (shackdwellers) movement, GroundWork, CINDI, PACSA, and the KwaZulu Natal Christian Council.

Notable residents
Don Armand, rugby player (born 1988)
Neil Adcock, Springbok cricketer and radio cricket commentator
Dale Benkenstein, former cricketer
Kork Ballington, World 250cc and 350cc Motorcycle Champion
Melissa Carlton, Paralympic swimmer who represented Australia
Amod Cassimjee, one of the earliest known Indian settlers
Pat Cilliers, rugby player (born 1987)
Andrew Dalby, fighter pilot, historian, sportsman, involuntary dog owner (born 1970)
Brendon Dedekind, swimmer (born 1976)
Bathabile Dlamini, leader of the African National Congress Women's League and Minister of Women in the Presidency, and Minister of Social Development (born 1962)
Matthew Dobson, Rugby Union player. Attended Merchiston Preparatory School & St. Charles College, Pietermaritzburg
Jon Ekerold, world 350cc motorcycle champion
Sarel Erwee, South Africa national cricket team player. Attended St. Charles College, Pietermaritzburg.
Brett Evans, (born 8 March 1982) South African Football (soccer) player attended Merchiston Preparatory School and Maritzburg College and played for Maritzburg City as an amateur
Adrian Furnham (born 1953), British-based organisational and applied psychologist and academic
Hayden Griffin (1943–2013), British stage designer
Tim Groenewald, Derbyshire and Warwickshire Cricketer (born 1984)
Archie Gumede, leader of the United Democratic Front (South Africa) and Member of the Parliament of South Africa
Adam Habib, vice-chancellor and principal of the University of the Witwatersrand (born 1965)
Jonathan Handley, singer-songwriter (born 1954), originally from Springs, founder of The Radio Rats who in 1979 had a hit single "ZX Dan" on Radio 5 (now 5FM)
Bessie Head, writer, was born in Pietermaritzburg in 1937.
Roy Hesketh, (1915–1944) racing driver and South African Air Force pilot.
Butch James, Springbok and  rugby player attended Maritzburg College from 1994 to 2000. He played for Colleges' 3rd team.
Stratford Johns, (22 September 1925 – 29 January 2002) British stage, film and television actor. Left for Britain in 1948.
Peter Johnstone, Park Villa FC (born 1970), left PMB in 2004
Craig Joubert, international rugby union referee (born 8 November 1977).  Attended Merchiston Preparatory School and Maritzburg College
Jesse Kriel, Springbok rugby player (born 1994). Attended Merchiston Preparatory School and Maritzburg College
Charlie Llewellyn, cricketer (born 1876), first non-White Test cricketer for South Africa.
Mbulelo Mabizela, South African national football team player (born 1981)
Nduduzo Makhathini, jazz musician
Clinton Marius, writer, performer (born 1966)
Thuso Mbedu, actress (born 1991). Attended Pietermaritzburg Girls' High School
Jomu Mbili, cricketer (born 1981)
Cuan McCarthy, fast-bowling The Proteas cricketer 1929–2000
Phyllis McCarthy, authority on and breeder of Rhodesian Ridgebacks
Cathcart William Methven (1849–1925), painter, engineer and architect
David Miller, cricketer (born 1989). Attended Maritzburg College.
Greg Minnaar, professional downhill mountain bike racer. He attended Carter High School.
Emmanuel Mkhize, cricketer (born 1989)
Zweli Mkhize, politician, former Kwazulu-Natal premier, national minister and South African current minister of health (born 2 February 1956). Born and raised in Willowfountain. Lived in Ashburton, Pietermaritzburg
Bryce Moon, (born 1986) South Africa national football team (soccer) player was born in Pietermaritzburg and played for Pirates in his youth
Ryan Moon, South Africa national football team player (born 15 September 1996). Attended Maritzburg College
Shaun Morgan, lead singer of Seether, former resident of Pietermaritzburg, attended both Merchiston Preparatory School and Maritzburg College while he lived there.
Nina Myskow, British journalist and television personality. Born in Pietermaritzburg and attended The Wykeham Collegiate, before moving to Scotland with her family aged 15.
Siphesihle Ndlovu, Premier Soccer League and South Africa national football team player.
Nkosingiphile Ngcobo, Premier Soccer League
 Blade Nzimande (born 1958), South African national minister and president of the South African Communist Party. He attended Georgetown High School, Edendale & the University of Natal. 
Alan Paton, author of Cry the Beloved Country, was born and schooled (Maritzburg College) in Pietermaritzburg.
Vyvyan Pearse (1891–1956), cricketer
Kevin Pietersen, cricketer (born 1980)
Graeme Pope-Ellis, canoeist. Attended Alexandra High School.
Rowland Raw (1884–1915), cricketer 
Jonty Rhodes, national cricketer (born 1969)
Lunga Shabalala, (born 1989), TV presenter, TV personality and actor. He attended Maritzburg College.
Tom Sharpe, novelist, who described the city as "half the size of a New York cemetery and twice as dead".
Peter Leslie Smith, auxiliary bishop for the Archdiocese of Portland in Oregon (born 1958)
Guy Spier, value investor (born 4 February 1966 in Grey's hospital).
Dale Stewart, bassist of Seether, former resident of Pietemaritzburg.
Joel Stransky, Springbok rugby player (born 1967). Born in Pietermaritzburg, attended Maritzburg College and University of Natal
Darian Townsend, Olympic swimmer. Attended Merchiston Preparatory School and Maritzburg College
Kevin Volans, composer (born 1949)
Lance Woolridge, rally driver
Philani Zulu, Premier Soccer League player
Dumisani Zuma, Premier Soccer League player
Lwandiswa Zuma South African first-class cricketer (born 11 July 1996) attended Maritzburg College

Various 

Built in 1900, the City Hall was then the largest all-brick building in the southern hemisphere. It was declared a national monument in 1969.
At 14 metres high, the statue Pegasus adorning the entrance of the Golden Horse Casino was the largest statue of a horse in the world. However, as of July 2010, the statue has been demolished due to internal structural damage.

Twin towns and sister cities

See also 

 Trams in Pietermaritzburg

Notes

Bibliography 

 Jenkins, G. 1971. A Century of History: the story of Potchefstroom. 2nd ed. AA Balkema. Cape Town. 120 p.

External links 

 
 Pietermaritzburg
 Pietermaritzburg Tourism
 Pietermaritzburg News
 Pietermaritzburg

 
1838 establishments in South Africa
Cities in South Africa
Populated places established in 1838
Populated places founded by Afrikaners
Populated places in the Msunduzi Local Municipality
Provincial capitals in South Africa
Second Boer War concentration camps